The Switzerland national cricket team represents the country of Switzerland in international cricket.

History
Cricket has been played in Switzerland since at least 1817. 

The association (renamed to Cricket Switzerland in 2014), became an affiliate member of the International Cricket Council in 1985. They hosted the first tournament for European affiliate members in Zuoz in 1997, the European Nations Cup, where they came fifth in the seven team tournament. They then played in the successor tournament, the European Cricket Council Trophy in 1999, 2001 and 2003, their best result coming in 1999 when they reached the semi-finals. They then played in the European Representative Championship in Slovenia in 2004, where they came third in the six team tournament. 

They played in Division Four of the European Championship in 2009 having been promoted from Division Five, playing Austria, Cyprus, Finland, Luxembourg and Slovenia.

Switzerland was ranked to participate in ICC European Division II, Belgium 2011, but unfortunately, internal differences meant Switzerland were forced to withdraw from the tournament and hence was demoted to Division III. 

These internal differences resulted from two rival governing bodies attempting to govern cricket in Switzerland, and this along with various breaches of membership regulations of the International Cricket Council led to Switzerland being expelled from the Council. 

With these governance issues resolved, an application to rejoin the ICC was submitted in October 2020. Switzerland were granted associate ICC Membership on 23 July 2021.

There are currently more than 30 clubs playing in Switzerland.

Records and statistics 

International Match Summary — Switzerland
 
Last updated 31 July 2022

Twenty20 International 

T20I record versus other nations

Records complete to T20I #1715. Last updated 31 July 2022.

See also
 List of Switzerland Twenty20 International cricketers

References

Cricket
Cricket in Switzerland
National cricket teams